Clostridium ganghwense is a Gram-negative, strictly anaerobic, rod-shaped, spore-forming, halophilic and motile bacterium from the genus Clostridium which has been isolated from tidal flat from the Ganghwa Island in Korea.

References

 

Bacteria described in 2006
ganghwense